The Missouri-Kansas Bowl was a National Association of Intercollegiate Athletics post-season college football bowl game played in Kansas City, Missouri for the 1948 season.

The game was the first post-season appearance for Emporia State.  Southwest Missouri State achieved their bowl bid by winning their conference that year.

Game result

References

Defunct college football bowls